In mathematics, a quippian is a  degree 5 class 3 contravariant of a plane cubic introduced by  and discussed by . In the same paper Cayley also introduced another similar invariant that he called the pippian, now called the Cayleyan.

See also

Glossary of classical algebraic geometry

References

Algebraic geometry
Invariant theory